Body image is a complex construct, often used in the clinical context of describing a patient's cognitive perception of their own body. The medical concept began with the work of the Austrian neuropsychiatrist and psychoanalyst Paul Schilder, described in his book The Image and Appearance of the Human Body first published in 1935. The term “body image” was officially introduced by Schilder himself and his widely used definition is: “body image is the picture of our own body we form in our mind, that is to say the way in which the body appears to ourselves”. In research with the term “body image” we currently refer to a conscious mental representation of one’s own body, which involves affects, attitudes, perceptual components and cognition. On the contrary the term “body schema” was initially used to describe an unconscious body mental representation fundamental for action. Keizer and colleagues (2013) suggest the following definition: “[body schema is] an unconscious, sensorimotor, representation of the body that is invoked in action. In light of recent scientific developments regarding the multisensory integration of body sensations, the distinction between body image and body schema appears simplistic and probably no longer useful for scientific research and clinical purposes.

Clinical significance 
In the clinical setting, body image disturbances are relatively frequent  and involve both psychiatric and neurological disorders. Disturbances in the perception of one's body are present in psychiatric disorders such as:

 anorexia nervosa
 bulimia nervosa
 binge eating disorder
 psychotic spectrum disorders
 body dysmorphic disorder
 body integrity dysphoria (not included in DSM-5). 
 Cotard delusion

Body image disorders are common in eating disorders and are referred to as "body image disturbance.

Disturbances in the body image are also present in neurological conditions such as:

 somatoparaphrenia
 unilateral neglect
 Alice in Wonderland syndrome

See also 
 Body schema
 Mirror box
 Rubber hand illusion
 Body image—social concept

References 

Medical terminology
Symptoms and signs of mental disorders
Neurology
Neuroscience